Katari Veera Surasundarangi is a 2012 Indian Kannada-language romantic fantasy film starring Upendra triple role two leads and one cameo appearance and Ramya. The film is a spiritual sequel to Upendra's 2003 film Raktha Kanneeru. Veteran actor Ambareesh also plays a vital role. The film is directed by Suresh Krishna and produced by Munirathna. It is the second full-length 3D film in Kannada cinema.

Plot
The film is a sequel to Upendra's earlier movie Rakta Kanneeru which was released in 2003.

Upendra (Upendra), is a wannabe don who dies in a gang war. When he reaches the doors of Heaven and Hell, he decides to go to hell as he feels heaven's beautiful look and silence makes it too boring. He soon meets Yama (Ambareesh) who is unable to decide whether to put him in hell or heaven as he has not done any sin nor any good deed. In the midst of this, Upendra finds his father, Mohan (also Upendra) and also falls in love with Indraja (Ramya), the daughter of Indra. After her initial rejection, He manages to get her to reciprocate as well. But Indra, refusing to let his daughter marry a human, challenges Upendra that he has to go to earth for 10 days with Indraja and will forget that he ever died once he reaches there. Furthermore, the challenge also stipulates that if Upendra commits a sin during the 10 days, he will have to forget Indraja. Upendra and Indraja accept the challenge and go to earth with Yama and Chitragupta (Doddanna). Once on earth, Upendra and Indraja get together with Upendra forgetting everything that happened when he died. But he overhears Indraja talking to Indra secretly and remembers everything. Yama in the meantime is desperate to make sure Upendra loses the challenge. He even changes Upendra's face with that of the don's (Ajay) who had killed Upendra in the first place. The film ends with Yama understanding the power of love and leaving from there and Upendra and Indraja getting married.

Cast 
 Upendra as Triple role Upendra aka. Mass Manava. aka. temporary yama and Mohan (cameo appearance)
 Ramya as Indraja
 Ambareesh as Yama
 Ajay
 Doddanna as Chitragupta
 Sridhar as  Indra
 Muthappa Rai as himself
 Balaraj
 Suman Ranganathan (special appearance)
 Rishika Singh (special appearance)
 Ramnitu Chaudhary (special appearance)

Production

Casting
The film was earlier rumoured to be a remake of Malayalam hit film Udayananu Tharam and was also rumoured to be having shades of Rajkumar starrer Katari Veera which was released in 1966. However, in a press meet Upendra denied all the rumours and said that his version is completely fresh and has no links with the above-mentioned films whatsoever. Producer Munirathna, who was once the main reason behind the banning of actress Nikita Thukral had approached her to do an item number dance for this film. Nikita had turned down the offer. Upendra had earlier titled this film as Yamendra Upendra and Sadhu Kokila had to direct this film. However, due to several reasons, Suresh Krishna was finally hired to direct it. A single song in the film has three actresses: Suman Ranganath, Ramanito Choudary and Rishika Singh.

Filming
Even during the making, the film drew the attention of stars from other industries. Bollywood actors Sunil Shetty, Mithun Chakraborty, Jaya Prada and Tamil star Karthik visited the shooting after the makers used seven cameras at a time. 3D stereoscopic solutions were given by Epic studios. 3d is made by K. P. Nambiathiri and his team (Sreekumar and Sambath Mohandas). Sound design and final mixing of the movie done by Renjith Viswanathan.

Promotion & Publicity
The trailers of Kataari Veera Sura Sundaraangi which were shown in the single screen theaters and multiplexes across Karnataka aroused lot of appreciation among the audience. Meanwhile, Upendra, Ramya and Munirathna promoted the film.

Soundtrack

Reception

Critical response 

A critic from The Times of India scored the film at 3 out of 5 stars and says "Full marks to Ambarish for his excellent portrayal of Yama. Doddanna has done justice to his role. A surprise character is Muthappa Rai who has executed a don's role quite well. Music by V Harikrishna is average. Cinematography by HC Venu is brilliant". A critic from NDTV wrote "cinematographer H.C. Venu and editor Jony Harsha's technical support. But Hari Krishna's music is inconsistent. Katari Veera Sura Sundaraangi is a well-made entertainer. The 3D format is a treat to watch". Srikanth Srinivasa from Rediff.com scored the film at 3.5 out of 5 stars and wrote "Katari Veera Sura Sundaraangi will do for Kannada cinema what Avatar did for Hollywood. Producer Munirathna Naidu needs to be commended for investing in a 3D film and pioneering it in Kannada cinema. Just forget the story. Watch it with your 3D glasses on and be entertained!". B S Srivani from Deccan Herald wrote " “Katariveera...” manages to wow viewers mainly through its art design and Upendra’s dialogues that have a touch of desperation. But these are desperate times, aren’t they?". A critic from News18 India wrote "V Harikrishna is not with lovely numbers in this film. Parijatha song for Ramya in heaven is the best one.This is worth watching for 3D technology lovers".

Box office

Its opening weekend collection was a strong  57 million. The film went on to gross a total of  72 million in its first week, thus breaking the records set by Chingari which had collected  60 million in its first week. Katari Veera Surasundarangi was reported to be one of the biggest openers of Kannada cinema of its time next to Anna Bond and Jogayya. The film recovered its investment at the end of its second week The film grossed more than  160 million at the box office after completing 50 days of run in 16 centers across Karnataka.
 Katari Veera Suruasundarangi was declared as a Super Hit and was the Second Highest Grossing Kannada film of 2012 behind Kranthi Veera Sangolli Rayanna.

Accolades

References

External links

2012 films
2012 3D films
Indian 3D films
2010s Kannada-language films
Indian romantic fantasy films
2010s romantic fantasy films
Indian sequel films
Films directed by Suresh Krissna
Films scored by V. Harikrishna
Hindu mythology in popular culture